Tuula Hovi (born 14 November 1939) is a Finnish orienteering competitor who competed in the 1960s. She participated at the first European Orienteering Championships in Løten in 1962, where she placed fourth in the individual course. At the 1964 Championships in Le Brassus, she placed sixth in the individual course, and also participated in the Finnish relay team which placed fifth.

At the 1968 World Orienteering Championships in Linköping she placed 11th in the individual course, and won a bronze medal in the relay event for the Finnish team, together with Pirjo Seppä and Raila Kerkelä.

See also
 List of orienteers
 List of orienteering events

References

1939 births
Living people
Finnish orienteers
Female orienteers
Foot orienteers
World Orienteering Championships medalists